= Jajaja Mexicana =

Mexican restaurant group in US

Coordinates: 40°42′51″N 73°59′25″W

Jajaja Mexicana (pronounced "hahaha") is a plant-based Mexican restaurant group based in New York City, US. It was founded in 2017. It has locations in Manhattan, Brooklyn, Queens, Miami, and New Jersey.

== History ==
Jajaja Mexicana was established on the Lower East Side of Manhattan in 2017. It was created as a plant-based dining alternative that combined traditional Mexican flavors with a focus on health-conscious ingredients. The group later expanded to additional locations, including the West Village, Williamsburg, Hudson Yards, Long Island City, Union City (New Jersey) and Miami (Florida).

== Activities ==
The restaurant group serves plant-based foods inspired by the regional Mexican cuisine. Dishes include vegan tacos, burritos, enchiladas, and bowls, along with house-made tortillas and plant-based proteins. The beverage program highlights mezcal and tequila based cocktails, Mexican craft beers, and non-alcoholic options such as aguas frescas and fermented juices. The restaurant is Kosher certified.

== Reception ==
The restaurant has been featured in major publications, including The New Yorker, The Daily Meal, The New York Times, The Infatuation, Eater NY, and Time Out New York.
